The Islamic Foundation of Toronto is one of the largest and oldest Islamic community centers in Canada. It is located at the southwest corner of the intersection of Markham Road and Nugget Avenue in the former city of Scarborough. It is one of the most widely recognized Masjids in the Greater Toronto Area and has hosted many internationally renowned speakers and guests. The current imam and Director of Religious Affairs of the Masjid is Yusuf Badat.

History
The Islamic Foundation of Toronto was established in 1969, when an old  building was purchased at Rhodes Avenue and converted into a mosque.

The  site, where the Islamic Foundation currently stands, was purchased in 1984. At the time, an elementary school was also conceived as an integral part of the Foundation. The majestic three-storied building in its current form, made from white stone, was completed in 1992 at a cost of about six million dollars, almost all of which was raised by the local Muslim community.

In August 2017, the Islamic Foundation abruptly closed the high school portion of the school, leaving over 160 students scrambling to find a new school before the school year started in September. This was devastating news for hundreds of parents and children, many of whom had contributed thousands of dollars and a significant number of volunteer hours for the school. As of November 2017, the elementary and middle school portions were still open, though enrollment has significantly decreased.

On March 16, 2020, all facilities were closed indefinitely due to the coronavirus pandemic in Ontario. The foundation announced that "no prayers will take place until further notice" citing Ontario's Chief Medical Officer of Health's recommendation to close places of worship. Following the rollout of COVID-19 vaccines, the foundation received a $125,000 grant from the Public Health Agency of Canada's Immunization Partnership Fund to promote vaccine uptake through influencers and community leaders.

Activities and organization

The Islamic Community Centre is accessible by public transportation and is open for the five daily prayers. The Friday congregation prayer is attended by almost 2,000 worshippers. The full-time school has a qualified staff with over 300 students from Junior Kindergarten to grade eight. More than four hundred students attend the evening and weekend Islamic classes.

The governing body of the Islamic Foundation is an elected Majlis consisting of seven members. To ensure accountability, there is also an elected board of trustees which holds the title to the property and advises the Majlis. The audited accounts are published yearly, and the books and meetings are open to the members, as required by the constitution of the foundation. Nonetheless, the Majlis has been known to have issues with transparency and has been accused of selfish practices, especially due to the recent sudden shut down of the high school.

References

External links
 Islamic Foundation Toronto official website
 Entry on Torontomuslims.com

Mosques in Toronto
Religious buildings and structures with domes
Islamic organizations based in Canada
Organizations based in Toronto
Buildings and structures in Scarborough, Toronto